Yelena Alekseyevna Shalina  (born 22 September 1969 in Barnaul, Soviet Union)  is a former Russian cross-country skier who competed from 1992 to 1996. Her best World Cup finish was seventh on three occasions (30 km in Russia: 1993, 5 km and 15 km in Italy: both in 1994).

Cross-country skiing results
All results are sourced from the International Ski Federation (FIS).

World Cup

Season standings

Team podiums
 2 podiums

References

External links
 

1969 births
Living people
Russian female cross-country skiers
Place of birth missing (living people)
Sportspeople from Barnaul